Skjerven is a Norwegian surname. Notable people with the surname include:

Elsa Skjerven (1919–2005), Norwegian politician 
Herman Skjerven (1872–1952), Norwegian sport shooter
Tommy Skjerven (born 1967), Norwegian football referee

See also
Skjerve

Norwegian-language surnames